The 2012–13 season is the 111th season of competitive football in Hong Kong, starting in July 2012 and ending in June 2013.

Promotion and relegation
Team relegated from First Division League
 Hong Kong Sapling (folded)
 Sham Shui Po

Team promoted to First Division League
 Kam Fung
 Southern District

Team relegated from Second Division League
 Kwun Tong
 Kwai Tsing

Team promoted to Second Division League
 Eastern
 Tuen Mun FC

Team relegated from Third Division League

Third A Division League
 Sai Kung Friends
 Ornament
 Solon
 Lung Moon
 Tung Sing
 Sun Source
 Blake Garden
 Kwong Wah
 St. Joseph's

Third District Division League
 Central & Western District
 Sai Kung
 Yau Tsim Mong
 Northern District

Honours

Trophy and league champions

Promotion winners

Playoffs winners

Representative team

Hong Kong

2013 EAFF East Asian Cup qualification

The qualification stage (semi-final competition) of the 2013 EAFF East Asian Cup will be held from 1 December to 9 December 2012 in Hong Kong. Hong Kong will play against Australia, Chinese Taipei, Guam and North Korea. Winner of the group qualifies and advances to the final competition held in South Korea.

Match detail

Match detail

Match detail

Match detail

2015 AFC Asian Cup qualification

The draw for the group stage of qualification was held in Australia on 9 October 2012. Hong Kong was drawn with Uzbekistan, United Arab Emirates and Vietnam. Hong Kong will start their 2015 Asian Cup qualifying campaign in February 2013.

Match detail

Match detail

2013 Guangdong–Hong Kong Cup

This is a tournament between two teams representing Hong Kong and Guangdong Province of China respectively. The first leg will take place in Huizhou, Guangdong, being held in Huizhou Olympic Stadium, and the second leg took place in Hong Kong, being held in Mong Kok Stadium.

Guangdong took the 1–0 lead in the first leg, thanks to Yin Hongbo's goalscoring penalty before the end of match. However, Hong Kong levelled the game in the second leg, with Bai He's and Lee Wai Lim's header, while Guangdong's Shi Liang scored once. After 120 minutes of play, the scoreline levels in 2–2, thus the game proceeded to penalty shoot-out stage. Both team scored 8 out of 8 penalties perfectly, and Wisdom Fofo Agbo scored the ninth penalty for Hong Kong. However, Guangdong's Shi Liang, who scored once in the tournament, missed the kick as Yapp Hung Fai saved. Hong Kong won the champions of the 2013 edition.

Match detail

Match detail

Friendly matches in first half season
An away friendly match for Hong Kong is proposed. Hong Kong will play against Singapore in August. The match was originally proposed to play at Bishan Stadium in Bishan, but then changed to Jurong West Stadium in Jurong West.

Match detail

According to the official website of the FIFA, Hong Kong will play a home match against Malaysia on 16 October 2012.

Match detail

According to the official website of the FIFA, Hong Kong will play an away match against Malaysia on 14 November 2012.

Match detail

Friendly matches in second half season
According to the official website of the FIFA, Hong Kong will play a home match against the Philippines on 4 June 2013.

Match detail

Hong Kong Under-21

Friendly matches in first half season
The Hong Kong Football Association has organised a friendly match between the Hong Kong U-21 and Australia U-19 on 29 August 2012 at Mong Kok Stadium, Hong Kong.

First Division League

Monthly awards
The monthly awards are organised by the Hong Kong Sports Press Association. 20 journalists who specialise in football in Hong Kong will vote their best player of the month. Player with the highest number of votes wins the award.

Second Division League

Third Division League

Fourth Division League

Exhibition matches

Arsenal's Asia Tour 2012 against Kitchee
English Premier League side Arsenal played against Hong Kong First Division League champions Kitchee on Sunday, 29 July 2012 at the Hong Kong Stadium as part of Arsenal's Asia Tour 2012.

References